Edge of Darkness is a 1985 British television crime-drama serial.

Edge of Darkness may also refer to:

Edge of Darkness (1943 film), a war film directed by Lewis Milestone
Edge of Darkness (2010 film), a film adaptation of the 1985 TV series
Edge of Darkness (soundtrack), a soundtrack album from the series, by Eric Clapton and Michael Kamen
"The Edge of Darkness", a song from the album The X Factor by Iron Maiden